Loreto Achaerandio Sánchez-Marín (born 13 September 1991) is a Spanish rhythmic gymnast, born in Madrid. She competed at the 2012 Summer Olympics in London, and the 2009, 2010 and 2011 Rhythmic Gymnastics World Championships.

References

External links

1991 births
Living people
Gymnasts from Madrid
Spanish rhythmic gymnasts
Olympic gymnasts of Spain
Gymnasts at the 2012 Summer Olympics